This is a list of the bird species recorded in Hong Kong. The avifauna of Hong Kong include a total of 595 species, of which 12 have been introduced by humans. 

This list's taxonomic treatment (designation and sequence of orders, families and species) and nomenclature (common and scientific names) follow the Hong Kong Bird List published by Hong Kong Bird Watching Society. Supplemental updates follow The Clements Checklist of Birds of the World, 2022 edition. The family accounts at the beginning of each heading reflect this taxonomy, as do the species counts found in each family account. Introduced and accidental species are included in the total counts for Hong Kong.

The following tags have been used to highlight several categories. The commonly occurring native species do not fall into any of these categories.

(A) Accidental - a species that rarely or accidentally occurs in Hong Kong
(I) Introduced - a species introduced to Hong Kong as a consequence, direct or indirect, of human actions

Ducks, geese, and waterfowl
Order: AnseriformesFamily: Anatidae

Anatidae includes the ducks and most duck-like waterfowl, such as geese and swans. These birds are adapted to an aquatic existence with webbed feet, flattened bills, and feathers that are excellent at shedding water due to an oily coating.

Lesser whistling-duck, Dendrocygna javanica
Graylag goose, Anser anser (A)
Greater white-fronted goose, Anser albifrons (A)
Lesser white-fronted goose, Anser erythropus (A)
Taiga bean goose, Anser fabalis (A)
Tundra bean goose, Anser serrirostris (A)
Whooper swan, Cygnus cygnus (A)
Ruddy shelduck, Tadorna ferruginea
Common shelduck, Tadorna tadorna
Cotton pygmy-goose, Nettapus coromandelianus (A)
Mandarin duck, Aix galericulata (A)
Baikal teal, Sibirionetta formosa 
Garganey, Spatula querquedula
Northern shoveler, Spatula clypeata
Gadwall, Mareca strepera
Falcated duck, Mareca falcata
Eurasian wigeon, Mareca penelope
American wigeon, Mareca americana (A)
Philippine duck, Anas luzonica (A)
Indian spot-billed duck, Anas poecilorhyncha (A)
Eastern spot-billed duck, Anas zonorhyncha
Mallard, Anas platyrhynchos
Northern pintail, Anas acuta
Green-winged teal, Anas crecca
Red-crested pochard, Netta rufina (A)
Common pochard, Aythya ferina
Ferruginous duck, Aythya nyroca (A)
Baer's pochard, Aythya baeri (A)
Tufted duck, Aythya fuligula
Greater scaup, Aythya marila 
Velvet scoter, Melanitta fusca (A)
White-winged scoter, Melanitta deglandi (A)
Stejneger's scoter, Melanitta stejnegeri (A)
Black scoter, Melanitta americana (A)
Common goldeneye, Bucephala clangula (A)
Smew, Mergellus albellus (A)
Red-breasted merganser, Mergus serrator
Scaly-sided merganser, Mergus squamatus

Pheasants, grouse, and allies
Order: GalliformesFamily: Phasianidae

The Phasianidae are a family of terrestrial birds. In general, they are plump (although they vary in size) and have broad, relatively short wings.

Chinese bamboo-partridge, Bambusicola thoracicus (A)
Chinese francolin, Francolinus pintadeanus
Blue-breasted quail, Synoicus chinensis
Japanese quail, Coturnix japonica

Grebes
Order: PodicipediformesFamily: Podicipedidae

Grebes are small to medium-large freshwater diving birds. They have lobed toes and are excellent swimmers and divers. However, they have their feet placed far back on the body, making them quite ungainly on land. 

Little grebe, Tachybaptus ruficollis
Horned grebe, Podiceps auritus (A)
Great crested grebe, Podiceps cristatus
Eared grebe, Podiceps nigricollis (A)

Pigeons and doves
Order: ColumbiformesFamily: Columbidae

Pigeons and doves are stout-bodied birds with short necks and short slender bills with a fleshy cere.

Rock pigeon, Columba livia (I)
Oriental turtle-dove, Streptopelia orientalis
Eurasian collared-dove, Streptopelia decaocto
Red collared-dove, Streptopelia tranquebarica
Spotted dove, Streptopelia chinensis
Barred cuckoo-dove, Macropygia unchall (A)
Asian emerald dove, Chalcophaps indica (I)
Orange-breasted green-pigeon, Treron bicinctus  (A)
Thick-billed green-pigeon, Treron curvirostra (A)
Wedge-tailed green-pigeon, Treron sphenurus (A)
White-bellied green-pigeon, Treron sieboldii (A)
Whistling green-pigeon, Treron formosae (A)

Cuckoos

Order: CuculiformesFamily: Cuculidae

The family Cuculidae includes cuckoos, roadrunners and anis. These birds are of variable size with slender bodies, long tails and strong legs. The Old World cuckoos are brood parasites.

Greater coucal, Centropus sinensis
Lesser coucal, Centropus bengalensis
Chestnut-winged cuckoo, Clamator coromandus
Asian koel, Eudynamys scolopacea
Plaintive cuckoo, Cacomantis merulinus
Square-tailed drongo-cuckoo, Surniculus lugubris (A)
Large hawk-cuckoo, Hierococcyx sparverioides
Northern hawk-cuckoo, Hierococcyx hyperythrus (A)
Hodgson's hawk-cuckoo, Hierococcyx nisicolor
Malaysian hawk-cuckoo, Hierococcyx fugax (A)
Lesser cuckoo, Cuculus poliocephalus
Indian cuckoo, Cuculus micropterus
Common cuckoo, Cuculus canorus (A)
Oriental cuckoo, Cuculus optatus

Nightjars
Order: CaprimulgiformesFamily: Caprimulgidae

Nightjars are medium-sized nocturnal birds that usually nest on the ground. They have long wings, short legs and very short bills. Most have small feet, of little use for walking, and long pointed wings. Their soft plumage is camouflaged to resemble bark or leaves.

Gray nightjar, Caprimulgus jotaka (A)
Savanna nightjar, Caprimulgus affinis

Swifts
Order: ApodiformesFamily: Apodidae

Swifts are small birds which spend the majority of their lives flying. These birds have very short legs and never settle voluntarily on the ground, perching instead only on vertical surfaces. Many swifts have long swept-back wings which resemble a crescent or boomerang. 

White-throated needletail, Hirundapus caudacutus
Silver-backed needletail, Hirundapus cochinchinensis
Brown-backed needletail, Hirundapus giganteus (A)
Himalayan swiftlet, Aerodramus brevirostris
Common swift, Apus apus (A)
Pacific swift, Apus pacificus
House swift, Apus nipalensis

Rails, gallinules, and coots

Order: GruiformesFamily: Rallidae

Rallidae is a large family of small to medium-sized birds which includes the rails, crakes, coots and gallinules. Typically they inhabit dense vegetation in damp environments near lakes, swamps or rivers. In general they are shy and secretive birds, making them difficult to observe. Most species have strong legs and long toes which are well adapted to soft uneven surfaces. They tend to have short, rounded wings and to be weak fliers.

Water rail, Rallus aquaticus (A)
Brown-cheeked rail, Rallus indicus
Slaty-breasted rail, Lewinia striata
Eurasian moorhen, Gallinula chloropus
Eurasian coot, Fulica atra
Gray-headed swamphen, Porphyrio poliocephalus (A)
White-browed crake, Poliolimnas cinereus (A)
Watercock, Gallicrex cinerea
White-breasted waterhen, Amaurornis phoenicurus
Slaty-legged crake, Rallina eurizonoides (A)
Ruddy-breasted crake, Zapornia fusca 
Band-bellied crake, Zapornia paykullii (A)
Brown crake, Zapornia akool (A)
Baillon's crake, Zapornia pusilla

Cranes
Order: GruiformesFamily: Gruidae

Cranes are large, long-legged and long-necked birds. Unlike the similar-looking but unrelated herons, cranes fly with necks outstretched, not pulled back. Most have elaborate and noisy courting displays or "dances". 

Siberian crane, Leucogeranus leucogeranus (A)
Common crane, Grus grus (A)

Thick-knees
Order: CharadriiformesFamily: Burhinidae

The thick-knees, also known as dikkops or stone-curlews, consist of species within the family Burhinidae, and are found throughout the tropical and temperate parts of the world.

Great thick-knee, Esacus recurvirostris (A)

Stilts and avocets
Order: CharadriiformesFamily: Recurvirostridae

Recurvirostridae is a family of large wading birds, which includes the avocets and stilts. The avocets have long legs and long up-curved bills. The stilts have extremely long legs and long, thin, straight bills. 

Black-winged stilt, Himantopus himantopus
Pied avocet, Recurvirostra avosetta

Oystercatchers
Order: CharadriiformesFamily: Haematopodidae

The oystercatchers are a group of waders; they form the family Haematopodidae, which has a single genus, Haematopus. 

Eurasian oystercatcher, Haematopus ostralegus (A)

Plovers and lapwings
Order: CharadriiformesFamily: Charadriidae

The family Charadriidae includes the plovers, dotterels and lapwings. They are small to medium-sized birds with compact bodies, short, thick necks and long, usually pointed, wings. They are found in open country worldwide, mostly in habitats near water. 

Black-bellied plover, Pluvialis squatarola
European golden-plover, Pluvialis apricaria (A)
American golden-plover, Pluvialis dominica (A)
Pacific golden-plover, Pluvialis fulva
Northern lapwing, Vanellus vanellus
Gray-headed lapwing, Vanellus cinereus
Lesser sand-plover, Charadrius mongolus
Greater sand-plover, Charadrius leschenaultii
Kentish plover, Charadrius alexandrinus
White-faced plover, Charadrius dealbatus (A)
Snowy plover, Charadrius nivosus
Common ringed plover, Charadrius hiaticula (A)
Long-billed plover, Charadrius placidus (A)
Little ringed plover, Charadrius dubius
Oriental plover, Charadrius veredus

Painted-snipes
Order: CharadriiformesFamily: Rostratulidae

Painted-snipes are short-legged, long-billed birds similar in shape to the true snipes, but more brightly coloured.

Greater painted-snipe, Rostratula benghalensis

Jacanas
Order: CharadriiformesFamily: Jacanidae

The jacanas are a group of tropical waders in the family Jacanidae. They are found throughout the tropics. They are identifiable by their huge feet and claws which enable them to walk on floating vegetation in the shallow lakes that are their preferred habitat. 

Pheasant-tailed jacana, Hydrophasianus chirurgus

Sandpipers and allies
Order: CharadriiformesFamily: Scolopacidae

Scolopacidae is a large diverse family of small to medium-sized shorebirds including the sandpipers, curlews, godwits, shanks, tattlers, woodcocks, snipes, dowitchers and phalaropes. The majority of these species eat small invertebrates picked out of the mud or soil. Variation in length of legs and bills enables multiple species to feed in the same habitat, particularly on the coast, without direct competition for food.

Whimbrel, Numenius phaeopus
Little curlew, Numenius minutus
Far Eastern curlew, Numenius madagascariensis
Eurasian curlew, Numenius arquata
Bar-tailed godwit, Limosa lapponica
Black-tailed godwit, Limosa limosa
Ruddy turnstone, Arenaria interpres
Great knot, Calidris tenuirostris
Red knot, Calidris canutus
Ruff, Calidris pugnax
Broad-billed sandpiper, Calidris falcinellus
Sharp-tailed sandpiper, Calidris acuminata
Curlew sandpiper, Calidris ferruginea
Temminck's stint, Calidris temminckii
Long-toed stint, Calidris subminuta
Spoon-billed sandpiper, Calidris pygmeus
Red-necked stint, Calidris ruficollis
Sanderling, Calidris alba
Dunlin, Calidris alpina
Little stint, Calidris minuta 
Buff-breasted sandpiper, Calidris subruficollis (A)
Pectoral sandpiper, Calidris melanotos (A)
Asian dowitcher, Limnodromus semipalmatus
Long-billed dowitcher, Limnodromus scolopaceus 
Eurasian woodcock, Scolopax rusticola
Common snipe, Gallinago gallinago
Pin-tailed snipe, Gallinago stenura
Swinhoe's snipe, Gallinago megala
Terek sandpiper, Xenus cinereus
Red-necked phalarope, Phalaropus lobatus
Red phalarope, Phalaropus fulicarius (A)
Common sandpiper, Actitis hypoleucos
Green sandpiper, Tringa ochropus
Gray-tailed tattler, Tringa brevipes
Spotted redshank, Tringa erythropus
Common greenshank, Tringa nebularia
Nordmann's greenshank, Tringa guttifer
Lesser yellowlegs, Tringa flavipes (A)
Marsh sandpiper, Tringa stagnatilis
Wood sandpiper, Tringa glareola
Common redshank, Tringa totanus

Buttonquail
Order: CharadriiformesFamily: Turnicidae

The buttonquail are small, drab, running birds which resemble the true quails. The female is the brighter of the sexes and initiates courtship. The male incubates the eggs and tends the young.

Small buttonquail, Turnix sylvaticus
Yellow-legged buttonquail, Turnix tanki 
Barred buttonquail, Turnix suscitator (A)

Pratincoles and coursers
Order: CharadriiformesFamily: Glareolidae

Glareolidae is a family of wading birds comprising the pratincoles, which have short legs, long pointed wings and long forked tails, and the coursers, which have long legs, short wings and long, pointed bills which curve downwards. 

Oriental pratincole, Glareola maldivarum

Skuas and jaegers
Order: CharadriiformesFamily: Stercorariidae

The family Stercorariidae are, in general, medium to large birds, typically with grey or brown plumage, often with white markings on the wings. They nest on the ground in temperate and arctic regions and are long-distance migrants. 

Pomarine jaeger, Stercorarius pomarinus 
Parasitic jaeger, Stercorarius parasiticus 
Long-tailed jaeger, Stercorarius longicaudus

Auks, murres and puffins
Order: CharadriiformesFamily: Alcidae

Alcids are superficially similar to penguins due to their black-and-white colours, their upright posture and some of their habits, however they are not related to the penguins and differ in being able to fly. Auks live on the open sea, only deliberately coming ashore to nest. 

Ancient murrelet, Synthliboramphus antiquus
Japanese murrelet, Synthliboramphus wumizusume (A)

Gulls, terns, and skimmers
Order: CharadriiformesFamily: Laridae

Laridae is a family of medium to large seabirds, the gulls, terns, and skimmers. Gulls are typically grey or white, often with black markings on the head or wings. They have stout, longish bills and webbed feet. Terns are a group of generally medium to large seabirds typically with grey or white plumage, often with black markings on the head. Most terns hunt fish by diving but some pick insects off the surface of fresh water. Terns are generally long-lived birds, with several species known to live in excess of 30 years.

Black-legged kittiwake, Rissa tridactyla
Saunders's gull, Saundersilarus saundersi
Slender-billed gull, Chroicocephalus genei (A)
Black-headed gull, Chroicocephalus ridibundus
Brown-headed gull, Chroicocephalus brunnicephalus
Little gull, Hydrocoloeus minutus (A)
Franklin's gull, Leucophaeus pipixcan (A)
Relict gull, Ichthyaetus relictus (A)
Pallas's gull, Ichthyaetus ichthyaetus 
Black-tailed gull, Larus crassirostris
Common gull, Larus canus (A)
Short-billed gull, Larus brachyrhynchus (A)
Ring-billed gull, Larus delawarensis (A)
Herring gull, Larus argentatus
Caspian gull, Larus cachinnans
Iceland gull, Larus glaucoides (A)
Lesser black-backed gull, Larus fuscus
Slaty-backed gull, Larus schistisagus 
Glaucous-winged gull, Larus glaucescens (A)
Glaucous gull, Larus hyperboreus (A)
Brown noddy, Anous stolidus (A)
Black noddy, Anous minutus (A)
Sooty tern, Onychoprion fuscatus (A)
Bridled tern, Onychoprion anaethetus
Aleutian tern, Onychoprion aleuticus
Little tern, Sternula albifrons
Gull-billed tern, Gelochelidon nilotica
Caspian tern, Hydroprogne caspia
White-winged tern, Chlidonias leucopterus
Whiskered tern, Chlidonias hybrida
Roseate tern, Sterna dougallii 
Black-naped tern, Sterna sumatrana
Common tern, Sterna hirundo
Great crested tern, Thalasseus bergii

Tropicbirds
Order: PhaethontiformesFamily: Phaethontidae

Tropicbirds are a family, Phaethontidae, of tropical pelagic seabirds now classified in their own order Phaethontiformes. Their relationship to other living birds is unclear, and they appear to have no close relatives. They have predominantly white plumage with elongated tail feathers and small feeble legs and feet.

White-tailed tropicbird, Phaethon lepturus (A)

Loons
Order: GaviiformesFamily: Gaviidae

Loons, known as divers in Europe, are a group of aquatic birds found in many parts of North America and northern Europe. They are the size of a large duck or small goose, which they somewhat resemble when swimming, but to which they are completely unrelated. 

Red-throated loon, Gavia stellata (A)
Pacific loon, Gavia pacifica (A)
Yellow-billed loon, Gavia adamsii (A)

Shearwaters and petrels
Order: ProcellariiformesFamily: Procellariidae

The procellariids are the main group of medium-sized "true petrels", characterised by united nostrils with medium septum and a long outer functional primary.

Bulwer's petrel, Bulweria bulwerii (A)
Streaked shearwater, Calonectris leucomelas
Flesh-footed shearwater, Ardenna carneipes (A)
Wedge-tailed shearwater, Ardenna pacificus (A)
Short-tailed shearwater, Ardenna tenuirostris

Storks
Order: CiconiiformesFamily: Ciconiidae

Storks are large, long-legged, long-necked, wading birds with long, stout bills. Storks are mute, but bill-clattering is an important mode of communication at the nest. Their nests can be large and may be reused for many years. Many species are migratory.

Black stork, Ciconia nigra 
Oriental stork, Ciconia boyciana

Frigatebirds
Order: SuiformesFamily: Fregatidae

Frigatebirds are large seabirds usually found over tropical oceans. They are large, black-and-white or completely black, with long wings and deeply forked tails. The males have coloured inflatable throat pouches. They do not swim or walk and cannot take off from a flat surface. Having the largest wingspan-to-body-weight ratio of any bird, they are essentially aerial, able to stay aloft for more than a week.

Lesser frigatebird, Fregata ariel 
Christmas Island frigatebird, Fregata andrewsi (A)
Great frigatebird, Fregata minor (A)

Boobies and gannets
Order: SuliformesFamily: Sulidae

The sulids comprise the gannets and boobies. Both groups are medium to large coastal seabirds that plunge-dive for fish.

Masked booby, Sula dactylatra (A)
Brown booby, Sula leucogaster (A)
Red-footed booby, Sula sula (A)

Cormorants and shags
Order: SuliformesFamily: Phalacrocoracidae

Phalacrocoracidae is a family of medium to large coastal, fish-eating seabirds that includes cormorants and shags. Plumage colouration varies, with the majority having mainly dark plumage, some species being black-and-white and a few being colourful. 

Great cormorant, Phalacrocorax carbo
Japanese cormorant, Phalacrocorax capillatus (A)

Pelicans
Order: PelecaniformesFamily: Pelecanidae

Pelicans are large water birds with a distinctive pouch under their beak. As with other members of the order Pelecaniformes, they have webbed feet with four toes.

Dalmatian pelican, Pelecanus crispus (A)

Herons, egrets, and bitterns

Order: PelecaniformesFamily: Ardeidae

The family Ardeidae contains the bitterns, herons and egrets. Herons and egrets are medium to large wading birds with long necks and legs. Bitterns tend to be shorter necked and more wary. Members of Ardeidae fly with their necks retracted, unlike other long-necked birds such as storks, ibises and spoonbills.

Great bittern, Botaurus stellaris
Yellow bittern, Ixobrychus sinensis
Schrenck's bittern, Ixobrychus eurhythmus 
Cinnamon bittern, Ixobrychus cinnamomeus
Black bittern, Ixobrychus flavicollis 
Gray heron, Ardea cinerea
Purple heron, Ardea purpurea
Great egret, Ardea alba
Intermediate egret, Ardea intermedia
Chinese egret, Egretta eulophotes
Little egret, Egretta garzetta
Pacific reef-heron, Egretta sacra
Cattle egret, Bubulcus ibis
Chinese pond-heron, Ardeola bacchus
Striated heron, Butorides striata
Black-crowned night-heron, Nycticorax nycticorax
Japanese night-heron, Gorsachius goisagi (A)
Malayan night-heron, Gorsachius melanolophus (A)

Ibises and spoonbills

Order: PelecaniformesFamily: Threskiornithidae

Threskiornithidae is a family of large terrestrial and wading birds which includes the ibises and spoonbills. They have long, broad wings with 11 primary and about 20 secondary feathers. They are strong fliers and despite their size and weight, very capable soarers.

Glossy ibis, Plegadis falcinellus (A)
Black-headed ibis, Threskiornis melanocephalus (A)
Eurasian spoonbill, Platalea leucorodia
Black-faced spoonbill, Platalea minor

Osprey
Order: AccipitriformesFamily: Pandionidae

The family Pandionidae contains only one species, the osprey. The osprey is a medium-large raptor which is a specialist fish-eater with a worldwide distribution.

Osprey, Pandion haliaetus

Hawks, eagles, and kites

Order: AccipitriformesFamily: Accipitridae

Accipitridae is a family of birds of prey, which includes hawks, eagles, kites, harriers and Old World vultures. These birds have powerful hooked beaks for tearing flesh from their prey, strong legs, powerful talons and keen eyesight.

Black-winged kite, Elanus caeruleus (A)
Oriental honey-buzzard, Pernis ptilorhynchus
Black baza, Aviceda leuphotes
Cinereous vulture, Aegypius monachus (A)
Crested serpent-eagle, Spilornis cheela
Mountain hawk-eagle, Nisaetus nipalensis (A)
Greater spotted eagle, Clanga clanga
Steppe eagle, Aquila nipalensis (A)
Imperial eagle, Aquila heliaca
Bonelli's eagle, Aquila fasciata
Gray-faced buzzard, Butastur indicus
Eastern marsh-harrier, Circus spilonotus
Hen harrier, Circus cyaneus (A)
Pied harrier, Circus melanoleucos 
Crested goshawk, Accipiter trivirgatus
Chinese sparrowhawk, Accipiter soloensis
Japanese sparrowhawk, Accipiter gularis
Besra, Accipiter virgatus
Eurasian sparrowhawk, Accipiter nisus 
Northern goshawk, Accipiter gentilis (A)
Black kite, Milvus migrans
Brahminy kite, Haliastur indus (A)
White-bellied sea-eagle, Haliaeetus leucogaster
Common buzzard, Buteo buteo
Eastern buzzard, Buteo japonicus

Barn-owls
Order: StrigiformesFamily: Tytonidae

Barn owls are medium to large owls with large heads and characteristic heart-shaped faces. They have long strong legs with powerful talons.

Australasian grass-owl, Tyto longimembris (A)

Owls

Order: StrigiformesFamily: Strigidae

The typical owls are small to large solitary nocturnal birds of prey. They have large forward-facing eyes and ears, a hawk-like beak and a conspicuous circle of feathers around each eye called a facial disk. 

Collared scops-owl, Otus lettia
Sunda scops-owl, Otus lempiji
Oriental scops-owl, Otus sunia 
Eurasian eagle-owl, Bubo bubo 
Brown fish-owl, Ketupa zeylonensis 
Asian barred owlet, Glaucidium cuculoides
Collared owlet, Taenioptynx brodiei (A)
Brown wood-owl, Strix leptogrammica 
Himalayan owl, Strix nivicolum
Short-eared owl, Asio flammeus (A)
Brown boobook, Ninox scutulata
Northern boobook, Ninox japonica

Hoopoes
Order: BucerotiformesFamily: Upupidae

Hoopoes have black, white and orangey-pink colouring with a large erectile crest on their head. 

Eurasian hoopoe, Upupa epops (A)

Kingfishers

Order: CoraciiformesFamily: Alcedinidae

Kingfishers are medium-sized birds with large heads, long, pointed bills, short legs and stubby tails. 

Common kingfisher, Alcedo atthis
Black-backed dwarf-kingfisher, Ceyx erithaca (A)
Ruddy kingfisher, Halcyon coromanda (A)
White-throated kingfisher, Halcyon smyrnensis
Black-capped kingfisher, Halcyon pileata
Collared kingfisher, Todirhamphus chloris (A)
Crested kingfisher, Megaceryle lugubris (A)
Pied kingfisher, Ceryle rudis

Bee-eaters
Order: CoraciiformesFamily: Meropidae

The bee-eaters are a group of near passerine birds in the family Meropidae. Most species are found in Africa but others occur in southern Europe, Madagascar, Australia and New Guinea. They are characterised by richly coloured plumage, slender bodies and usually elongated central tail feathers. All are colourful and have long downturned bills and pointed wings, which give them a swallow-like appearance when seen from afar. 

Blue-throated bee-eater, Merops viridis (A)
Blue-tailed bee-eater, Merops philippinus

Rollers
Order: CoraciiformesFamily: Coraciidae

Rollers resemble crows in size and build, but are more closely related to the kingfishers and bee-eaters. They share the colourful appearance of those groups with blues and browns predominating. The two inner front toes are connected, but the outer toe is not. 

European roller, Coracias garrulus (A)
Dollarbird, Eurystomus orientalis

Asian barbets
Order: PiciformesFamily: Megalaimidae

The Asian barbets are plump birds, with short necks and large heads. They get their name from the bristles which fringe their heavy bills. Most species are brightly coloured. 

Great barbet, Psilopogon virens
Chinese barbet, Psilopogon faber

Woodpeckers
Order: PiciformesFamily: Picidae

Woodpeckers are small to medium-sized birds with chisel-like beaks, short legs, stiff tails and long tongues used for capturing insects. Some species have feet with two toes pointing forward and two backward, while several species have only three toes. Many woodpeckers have the habit of tapping noisily on tree trunks with their beaks. 

Eurasian wryneck, Jynx torquilla
Speckled piculet, Picumnus innominatus 
Rufous-bellied woodpecker, Dendrocopos hyperythrus (A)
Bay woodpecker, Blythipicus pyrrhotis
Rufous woodpecker, Micropternus brachyurus (A)
Gray-headed woodpecker, Picus canus (A)

Falcons and caracaras
Order: FalconiformesFamily: Falconidae

Falconidae is a family of diurnal birds of prey. They differ from hawks, eagles and kites in that they kill with their beaks instead of their talons.

Eurasian kestrel, Falco tinnunculus
Amur falcon, Falco amurensis
Eurasian hobby, Falco subbuteo
Peregrine falcon, Falco peregrinus

Cockatoos
Order: PsittaciformesFamily: Cacatuidae

The cockatoos share many features with other parrots including the characteristic curved beak shape and a zygodactyl foot, with two forward toes and two backwards toes. They differ, however in a number of characteristics, including the often spectacular movable headcrest. 

Yellow-crested cockatoo, Cacatua sulphurea (I)

Old world parrots
Order: PsittaciformesFamily: Psittaculidae

Characteristic features of parrots include a strong curved bill, an upright stance, strong legs, and clawed zygodactyl feet. Many parrots are vividly coloured, and some are multi-coloured. Old World parrots are found from Africa east across south and southeast Asia and Oceania to Australia and New Zealand.

Alexandrine parakeet, Psittacula eupatria 
Rose-ringed parakeet, Psittacula krameri (I)

Pittas
Order: PasseriformesFamily: Pittidae

Pittas are medium-sized by passerine standards and are stocky, with fairly long, strong legs, short tails and stout bills. Many are brightly coloured. They spend the majority of their time on wet forest floors, eating snails, insects and similar invertebrates. 

Indian pitta, Pitta brachyura (A)
Blue-winged pitta, Pitta moluccensis (A)
Fairy pitta, Pitta nympha

Honeyeaters
Order: PasseriformesFamily: Meliphagidae

The honeyeaters are a large and diverse family of small to medium-sized birds most common in Australia and New Guinea. They are nectar feeders and closely resemble other nectar-feeding passerines.

 Blue-faced honeyeater, Entomyzon cyanotis (I)

Cuckooshrikes
Order: PasseriformesFamily: Campephagidae

The cuckooshrikes are small to medium-sized passerine birds. They are predominantly greyish with white and black, although some species are brightly coloured. 

Gray-chinned minivet, Pericrocotus solaris
Scarlet minivet, Pericrocotus speciosus
Ryukyu minivet, Pericrocotus tegimae (A)
Ashy minivet, Pericrocotus divaricatus
Brown-rumped minivet, Pericrocotus cantonensis
Rosy minivet, Pericrocotus roseus (A)
Black-winged cuckooshrike, Lalage melaschistos

Vireos, shrike-babblers, and erpornis
Order: PasseriformesFamily: Vireonidae

Most of the members of this family are found in the New World. However, the shrike-babblers and erpornis, which only slightly resemble the "true" vireos and greenlets, are found in South East Asia.

White-bellied erpornis, Erpornis zantholeuca

Old World orioles
Order: PasseriformesFamily: Oriolidae

The Old World orioles are colourful passerine birds. They are not related to the New World orioles. 

Black-naped oriole, Oriolus chinensis
Maroon oriole, Oriolus traillii (A)
Silver oriole, Oriolus mellianus (A)

Woodswallows
Order: PasseriformesFamily: Artamidae

Woodswallows are soft-plumaged, somber-coloured passerine birds. There is a single genus, Artamus. The woodswallows are either treated as a subfamily, Artaminae, in an expanded family Artamidae, which includes the butcherbirds and Australian magpie, or as the only genus in that family. 

Ashy woodswallow, Artamus fuscus (A)

Vangas, helmetshrikes, and allies
Order: PasseriformesFamily: Vangidae

The family Vangidae is highly variable, though most members of it resemble true shrikes to some degree.

Large woodshrike, Tephrodornis gularis

Drongos
Order: PasseriformesFamily: Dicruridae

The drongos are mostly black or dark grey in colour, sometimes with metallic tints. They have long forked tails, and some Asian species have elaborate tail decorations. They have short legs and sit very upright when perched, like a shrike. They flycatch or take prey from the ground. 

Black drongo, Dicrurus macrocercus
Ashy drongo, Dicrurus leucophaeus
Crow-billed drongo, Dicrurus annectens (A)
Hair-crested drongo, Dicrurus hottentottus

Monarch flycatchers
Order: PasseriformesFamily: Monarchidae

The monarch flycatchers are small to medium-sized insectivorous passerines which hunt by flycatching.

Black-naped monarch, Hypothymis azurea
Japanese paradise-flycatcher, Terpsiphone atrocaudata
Amur paradise-flycatcher, Terpsiphone incei

Shrikes
Order: PasseriformesFamily: Laniidae

Shrikes are passerine birds known for their habit of catching other birds and small animals and impaling the uneaten portions of their bodies on thorns. A typical shrike's beak is hooked, like a bird of prey.

Tiger shrike, Lanius tigrinus (A)
Bull-headed shrike, Lanius bucephalus 
Red-backed shrike, Lanius collurio (A)
Brown shrike, Lanius cristatus
Long-tailed shrike, Lanius schach
Gray-backed shrike, Lanius tephronotus (A)
Chinese gray shrike, Lanius sphenocercus (A)

Crows, jays, and magpies
Order: PasseriformesFamily: Corvidae

The family Corvidae includes crows, ravens, jays, choughs, magpies, treepies, nutcrackers and ground jays. Corvids are above average in size among the Passeriformes, and some of the larger species show high levels of intelligence. 

Eurasian jay, Garrulus glandarius (A)
Azure-winged magpie, Cyanopica cyanus (I)
Red-billed blue magpie, Urocissa erythrorhyncha
Indochinese green-magpie, Cissa hypoleuca (I)
Gray treepie, Dendrocitta formosae
Oriental magpie, Pica serica
Eurasian magpie, Pica pica
Daurian jackdaw, Corvus dauuricus (A)
House crow, Corvus splendens
Rook, Corvus frugilegus (A)
Carrion crow, Corvus corone (A)
Large-billed crow, Corvus macrorhynchos
Collared crow, Corvus torquatus

Fairy flycatchers
Order: PasseriformesFamily: Stenostiridae

Most of the species of this small family are found in Africa, though a few inhabit tropical Asia. They are not closely related to other birds called "flycatchers".

Gray-headed canary-flycatcher, Culicicapa ceylonensis

Tits, chickadees and titmice
Order: PasseriformesFamily: Paridae

The Paridae are mainly small stocky woodland species with short stout bills. Some have crests. They are adaptable birds, with a mixed diet including seeds and insects.

Fire-capped tit, Cephalopyrus flammiceps (A)
Yellow-bellied tit, Periparus venustulus
Varied tit, Sittiparus varius (A)
Japanese tit, Parus minor (A)
Yellow-cheeked tit, Machlolophus spilonotus

Penduline-tits
Order: PasseriformesFamily: Remizidae

The penduline tits are a group of small passerine birds related to the true tits. They are insectivores. 

Chinese penduline-tit, Remiz consobrinus

Larks
Order: PasseriformesFamily: Alaudidae

Larks are small terrestrial birds with often extravagant songs and display flights. Most larks are fairly dull in appearance. Their food is insects and seeds.

Mongolian short-toed lark, Calandrella dukhunensis (A)
Eurasian skylark, Alauda arvensis 
Oriental skylark, Alauda gulgula (A)

Cisticolas and allies
Order: PasseriformesFamily: Cisticolidae

The Cisticolidae are warblers found mainly in warmer southern regions of the Old World. They are generally very small birds of drab brown or grey appearance found in open country such as grassland or scrub.

Common tailorbird, Orthotomus sutorius
Yellow-bellied prinia, Prinia flaviventris
Plain prinia, Prinia inornata
Zitting cisticola, Cisticola juncidis
Golden-headed cisticola, Cisticola exilis

Reed warblers and allies 
Order: PasseriformesFamily: Acrocephalidae

The members of this family are usually rather large for "warblers". Most are rather plain olivaceous brown above with much yellow to beige below. They are usually found in open woodland, reedbeds, or tall grass. The family occurs mostly in southern to western Eurasia and surroundings, but it also ranges far into the Pacific, with some species in Africa.

Thick-billed warbler, Arundinax aedon
Booted warbler, Iduna caligata (A)
Sykes's warbler, Iduna rama (A)
Black-browed reed warbler, Acrocephalus bistrigiceps
Paddyfield warbler, Acrocephalus agricola (A)
Blunt-winged warbler, Acrocephalus concinens (A)
Manchurian reed warbler, Acrocephalus tangorum 
Blyth's reed warbler, Acrocephalus dumetorum (A)
Oriental reed warbler, Acrocephalus orientalis

Grassbirds and allies
Order: PasseriformesFamily: Locustellidae

Locustellidae are a family of small insectivorous songbirds found mainly in Eurasia, Africa, and the Australian region. They are smallish birds with tails that are usually long and pointed, and tend to be drab brownish or buffy all over.

Gray's grasshopper warbler, Helopsaltes fasciolatus (A)
Marsh grassbird, Helopsaltes pryeri (A)
Pallas's grasshopper warbler, Helopsaltes certhiola
Middendorff's grasshopper warbler, Helopsaltes ochotensis (A)
Pleske's grasshopper warbler, Helopsaltes pleskei
Lanceolated warbler, Locustella lanceolata
Brown bush warbler, Locustella luteoventris (A)
Chinese bush warbler, Locustella tacsanowskia
Baikal bush warbler, Locustella davidi (A)
Russet bush warbler, Locustella  mandelli
Benguet bush warbler, Locustella seebohmi

Cupwings
Order: PasseriformesFamily: Pnoepygidae

The members of this small family are found in mountainous parts of South and South East Asia.

Pygmy cupwing, Pnoepyga pusilla

Swallows
Order: PasseriformesFamily: Hirundinidae

The family Hirundinidae is adapted to aerial feeding. They have a slender streamlined body, long pointed wings and a short bill with a wide gape. The feet are adapted to perching rather than walking, and the front toes are partially joined at the base.

Gray-throated martin, Riparia chinensis (A)
Bank swallow, Riparia riparia
Pale sand martin, Riparia diluta
Barn swallow, Hirundo rustica
Red-rumped swallow, Cecropis daurica
Common house-martin, Delichon urbicum (A)
Asian house-martin, Delichon dasypus

Bulbuls
Order: PasseriformesFamily: Pycnonotidae

Bulbuls are medium-sized songbirds. Some are colourful with yellow, red or orange vents, cheeks, throats or supercilia, but most are drab, with uniform olive-brown to black plumage. Some species have distinct crests. 

Red-whiskered bulbul, Pycnonotus jocosus
Light-vented bulbul, Pycnonotus sinensis
Sooty-headed bulbul, Pycnonotus aurigaster
Black bulbul, Hypsipetes leucocephalus 
Brown-eared bulbul, Hypsipetes amaurotis (A)
Chestnut bulbul, Hemixos castanonotus
Mountain bulbul, Ixos mcclellandii

Leaf warblers
Order: PasseriformesFamily: Phylloscopidae

Leaf warblers are a family of small insectivorous birds found mostly in Eurasia and ranging into Wallacea and Africa. The species are of various sizes, often green-plumaged above and yellow below, or more subdued with greyish-green to greyish-brown colours.

Wood warbler, Phylloscopus sibilatrix (A)
Yellow-browed warbler, Phylloscopus inornatus
Hume's warbler, Phylloscopus humei (A)
Chinese leaf warbler, Phylloscopus yunnanensis (A)
Pallas's leaf warbler, Phylloscopus proregulus
Radde's warbler, Phylloscopus schwarzi 
Yellow-streaked warbler, Phylloscopus armandii (A)
Dusky warbler, Phylloscopus fuscatus
Willow warbler, Phylloscopus trochilus (A)
Mountain chiffchaff, Phylloscopus sindianus (A)
Common chiffchaff, Phylloscopus collybita (A)
Eastern crowned warbler, Phylloscopus coronatus
Ijima's leaf warbler, Phylloscopus ijimae (A)
White-spectacled warbler, Phylloscopus affinis (A)
Gray-crowned warbler, Phylloscopus tephrocephalus (A)
Bianchi's warbler, Phylloscopus valentini (A)
Martens's warbler, Phylloscopus omeiensis (A)
Alström's warbler, Phylloscopus soror (A)
Greenish warbler, Phylloscopus trochiloides (A)
Two-barred warbler, Phylloscopus trochiloides 
Emei leaf warbler, Phylloscopus emeiensis (A)
Pale-legged leaf warbler, Phylloscopus tenellipes
Sakhalin leaf warbler, Phylloscopus borealoides (A)
Japanese leaf warbler, Phylloscopus xanthodryas (A)
Arctic warbler, Phylloscopus borealis
Chestnut-crowned warbler, Phylloscopus castaniceps 
Sulphur-breasted warbler, Phylloscopus ricketti (A)
Claudia's leaf warbler, Phylloscopus claudiae (A)
Hartert's leaf warbler, Phylloscopus goodsoni
Kloss's leaf warbler, Phylloscopus ogilviegranti (A)

Bush warblers and allies
Order: PasseriformesFamily: Scotocercidae

The members of this family are found throughout Africa, Asia, and Polynesia. Their taxonomy is in flux, and some authorities place some genera in other families.

Pale-footed bush warbler, Urosphena pallidipes (A)
Asian stubtail, Urosphena squameiceps
Rufous-faced warbler, Abroscopus albogularis (A)
Mountain tailorbird, Phyllergates cuculatus
Manchurian bush warbler, Horornis borealis
Brownish-flanked bush warbler, Horornis fortipes

Long-tailed tits
Order: PasseriformesFamily: Aegithalidae

Long-tailed tits are a group of small passerine birds with medium to long tails. They make woven bag nests in trees. Most eat a mixed diet which includes insects. 

Black-throated tit, Aegithalos concinnus

Sylviid warblers, parrotbills, and allies
Order: PasseriformesFamily: Sylviidae

The family Sylviidae is a group of small insectivorous passerine birds. They mainly occur as breeding species, as the common name implies, in Europe, Asia and, to a lesser extent, Africa. Most are of generally undistinguished appearance, but many have distinctive songs.

Lesser whitethroat, Curruca curruca (A)
Spot-breasted parrotbill, Paradoxornis guttaticollis (A)
Vinous-throated parrotbill, Sinosuthora webbiana

White-eyes, yuhinas, and allies 
Order: PasseriformesFamily: Zosteropidae

The white-eyes are small and mostly undistinguished, their plumage above being generally some dull colour like greenish-olive, but some species have a white or bright yellow throat, breast or lower parts, and several have buff flanks. As their name suggests, many species have a white ring around each eye.

Indochinese yuhina, Staphida torqueola
Chestnut-flanked white-eye, Zosterops erythropleurus
Swinhoe's white-eye, Zosterops simplex

Tree-babblers, scimitar-babblers, and allies
Order: PasseriformesFamily: Timaliidae

The babblers, or timaliids, are somewhat diverse in size and colouration, but are characterised by soft fluffy plumage.

Rufous-capped babbler, Stachyridopsis ruficeps 
Streak-breasted scimitar-babbler, Pomatorhinus ruficollis

Ground babblers and allies
Order: PasseriformesFamily: Pellorneidae

These small to medium-sized songbirds have soft fluffy plumage but are otherwise rather diverse. Members of the genus Illadopsis are found in forests, but some other genera are birds of scrublands.

Chinese grassbird, Graminicola striatus

Laughingthrushes and allies
Order: PasseriformesFamily: Leiothrichidae

The members of this family are diverse in size and colouration, though those of genus Turdoides tend to be brown or greyish. The family is found in Africa, India, and southeast Asia.

Huet's fulvetta, Alcippe hueti (I)
Blue-winged minla, Minla cyanouroptera
Red-billed leiothrix, Leiothrix lutea
Silver-eared mesia, Leiothrix argentauris (I) 
Chinese hwamei, Garrulax canorus
Black-throated laughingthrush, Pterorhinus chinensis 
White-browed laughingthrush, Pterorhinus sannio 
Masked laughingthrush, Pterorhinus perspicillatus
Greater necklaced laughingthrush, Pterorhinus pectoralis 
Chinese babax, Pterorhinus lanceolatus (A)

Nuthatches
Order: PasseriformesFamily: Sittidae

Nuthatches are small woodland birds. They have the unusual ability to climb down trees head first, unlike other birds which can only go upwards. Nuthatches have big heads, short tails and powerful bills and feet. 

Velvet-fronted nuthatch, Sitta frontalis

Starlings
Order: PasseriformesFamily: Sturnidae

Starlings are small to medium-sized passerine birds. Their flight is strong and direct and they are very gregarious. Their preferred habitat is fairly open country. They eat insects and fruit. Plumage is typically dark with a metallic sheen.

European starling, Sturnus vulgaris 
Rosy starling, Pastor roseus (A)
Daurian starling, Agropsar sturninus 
Chestnut-cheeked starling, Agropsar philippensis
Black-collared starling, Gracupica nigricollis
White-shouldered starling, Sturnia sinensis
Chestnut-tailed starling, Sturnia malabarica 
Red-billed starling, Spodiopsar sericeus
White-cheeked starling, Spodiopsar cineraceus
Common myna, Acridotheres tristis (I)
Crested myna, Acridotheres cristatellus

Thrushes and allies
Order: PasseriformesFamily: Turdidae

The thrushes are a group of passerine birds that occur mainly in the Old World. They are plump, soft plumaged, small to medium-sized insectivores or sometimes omnivores, often feeding on the ground. Many have attractive songs.

White's thrush, Zoothera aurea
Scaly thrush, Zoothera dauma
Siberian thrush, Geokichla sibirica 
Orange-headed thrush, Geokichla citrina
Chinese thrush, Otocichla mupinensis (A)
Eurasian blackbird, Turdus merula
Chinese blackbird, Turdus mandarinus
Japanese thrush, Turdus cardis
Gray-backed thrush, Turdus hortulorum
Eyebrowed thrush, Turdus obscurus
Brown-headed thrush, Turdus chrysolaus 
Pale thrush, Turdus pallidus
Black-throated thrush, Turdus atrogularis (A)
Red-throated thrush, Turdus ruficollis (A)
Dusky thrush, Turdus eunomus
Naumann's thrush, Turdus naumanni (A)

Old World flycatchers
Order: PasseriformesFamily: Muscicapidae

Old World flycatchers are a large group of small passerine birds native to the Old World. They are mainly small arboreal insectivores. The appearance of these birds is highly varied, but they mostly have weak songs and harsh calls.

Gray-streaked flycatcher, Muscicapa griseisticta
Dark-sided flycatcher, Muscicapa sibirica
Ferruginous flycatcher, Muscicapa ferruginea 
Asian brown flycatcher, Muscicapa dauurica
Brown-breasted flycatcher, Muscicapa muttui (A) 
Oriental magpie-robin, Copsychus saularis
White-rumped shama, Copsychus malabaricus (I)
Hainan blue flycatcher, Cyornis hainanus
Chinese blue flycatcher, Cyornis glaucicomans (A)
Hill blue flycatcher, Cyornis whitei (A)
Brown-chested jungle flycatcher, Cyornis brunneatus (A)
Small niltava, Niltava macgrigoriae 
Fujian niltava, Niltava davidi 
Blue-and-white flycatcher, Cyanoptila cyanomelana
Zappey's flycatcher, Cyanoptila cumatilis (A)
Verditer flycatcher, Eumyias thalassinus
Lesser shortwing, Brachypteryx leucophris
Rufous-tailed robin, Larvivora sibilans
Japanese robin, Larvivora akahige
Siberian blue robin, Larvivora cyane
Bluethroat, Luscinia svecica
Blue whistling-thrush, Myophonus caeruleus
White-crowned forktail, Enicurus leschenaulti
Slaty-backed forktail, Enicurus schistaceus 
Siberian rubythroat, Calliope calliope
White-tailed robin, Myiomela leucura (A)
Red-flanked bluetail, Tarsiger cyanurus
Yellow-rumped flycatcher, Ficedula zanthopygia
Green-backed flycatcher, Ficedula elisae (A)
Narcissus flycatcher, Ficedula narcissina
Ryuku flycatcher, Ficedula owstoni (A)
Mugimaki flycatcher, Ficedula mugimaki
Slaty-backed flycatcher, Ficedula erithacus (A)
Rufous-gorgeted flycatcher, Ficedula strophiata 
Ultramarine flycatcher, Ficedula superciliaris (A)
Taiga flycatcher, Ficedula albicilla 
Red-breasted flycatcher, Ficedula parva
Plumbeous redstart, Phoenicurus fuliginosus
Hodgson's redstart, Phoenicurus hodgsoni (A)
Black redstart, Phoenicurus ochruros (A)
Daurian redstart, Phoenicurus auroreus
Chestnut-bellied rock-thrush, Monticola rufiventris (A)
White-throated rock-thrush, Monticola gularis (A)
Blue rock-thrush, Monticola solitarius
Siberian stonechat, Saxicola maurus
Amur stonechat, Saxicola stejnegeri
Gray bushchat, Saxicola ferreus
Pied wheatear, Oenanthe pleschanka (A)

Waxwings
Order: PasseriformesFamily: Bombycillidae

The waxwings are a group of birds with soft silky plumage and unique red tips to some of the wing feathers. In the Bohemian and cedar waxwings, these tips look like sealing wax and give the group its name. These are arboreal birds of northern forests. They live on insects in summer and berries in winter.

Japanese waxwing, Bombycilla japonica (A)

Flowerpeckers
Order: PasseriformesFamily: Dicaeidae

The flowerpeckers are very small, stout, often brightly coloured birds, with short tails, short thick curved bills and tubular tongues.

Plain flowerpecker, Dicaeum minullum (A)
Fire-breasted flowerpecker, Dicaeum ignipectus
Scarlet-backed flowerpecker, Dicaeum cruentatum

Sunbirds and spiderhunters
Order: PasseriformesFamily: Nectariniidae

The sunbirds and spiderhunters are very small passerine birds which feed largely on nectar, although they will also take insects, especially when feeding young. Flight is fast and direct on their short wings. Most species can take nectar by hovering like a hummingbird, but usually perch to feed. 

Mrs. Gould's sunbird, Aethopyga gouldiae
Fork-tailed sunbird, Aethopyga christinae

Leafbirds
Order: PasseriformesFamily: Chloropseidae

The leafbirds are small, bulbul-like birds. The males are brightly plumaged, usually in greens and yellows. 

Blue-winged leafbird, Chloropsis cochinchinensis (I)
Orange-bellied leafbird, Chloropsis hardwickii

Weavers and allies
Order: PasseriformesFamily: Ploceidae

The weavers are small passerine birds related to the finches. They are seed-eating birds with rounded conical bills. The males of many species are brightly coloured, usually in red or yellow and black, some species show variation in colour only in the breeding season.

Baya weaver, Ploceus philippinus (A)

Waxbills and allies
Order: PasseriformesFamily: Estrildidae

The estrildid finches are small passerine birds of the Old World tropics and Australasia. They are gregarious and often colonial seed eaters with short thick but pointed bills. They are all similar in structure and habits, but have wide variation in plumage colours and patterns. 

Scaly-breasted munia, Lonchura punctulata
White-rumped munia, Lonchura striata
Chestnut munia, Lonchura atricapilla (A)

Old World sparrows
Order: PasseriformesFamily: Passeridae

Sparrows are small passerine birds. In general, sparrows tend to be small, plump, brown or grey birds with short tails and short powerful beaks. Sparrows are seed eaters, but they also consume small insects. 

House sparrow, Passer domesticus (A)
Russet sparrow, Passer cinnamomeus
Eurasian tree sparrow, Passer montanus

Wagtails and pipits
Order: PasseriformesFamily: Motacillidae

Motacillidae is a family of small passerine birds with medium to long tails. They include the wagtails, longclaws and pipits. They are slender, ground feeding insectivores of open country. 

Forest wagtail, Dendronanthus indicus
Gray wagtail, Motacilla cinerea
Western yellow wagtail, Motacilla flava
Eastern yellow wagtail, Motacilla tschutschensis
Citrine wagtail, Motacilla citreola
White wagtail, Motacilla alba
Richard's pipit, Anthus richardi
Blyth's pipit, Anthus godlewskii (A)
Upland pipit, Anthus sylvanus
Rosy pipit, Anthus roseatus (A)
Tree pipit, Anthus trivialis (A)
Olive-backed pipit, Anthus hodgsoni
Pechora pipit, Anthus gustavi
Red-throated pipit, Anthus cervinus
Water pipit, Anthus spinoletta (A)
American pipit, Anthus rubescens

Finches, euphonias, and allies
Order: PasseriformesFamily: Fringillidae

Finches are seed-eating passerine birds, that are small to moderately large and have a strong beak, usually conical and in some species very large. All have twelve tail feathers and nine primaries. These birds have a bouncing flight with alternating bouts of flapping and gliding on closed wings, and most sing well. 

Brambling, Fringilla montifringilla
Hawfinch, Coccothraustes coccothraustes (A)
Yellow-billed grosbeak, Eophona migratoria
Japanese grosbeak, Eophona personata (A)
Common rosefinch, Carpodacus erythrinus 
Oriental greenfinch, Chloris sinica
Eurasian siskin, Spinus spinus

Longspurs and snow buntings
Order: PasseriformesFamily: Calcariidae

The Calcariidae are a group of passerine birds which had been traditionally grouped with the New World sparrows, but differ in a number of respects and are usually found in open grassy areas.

Lapland longspur, Calcarius lapponicus (A)

Old World buntings
Order: PasseriformesFamily: Emberizidae

The emberizids are a large family of passerine birds. They are seed-eating birds with distinctively shaped bills. Many emberizid species have distinctive head patterns. 

Crested bunting, Emberiza lathami
Black-headed bunting, Emberiza melanocephala
Red-headed bunting, Emberiza bruniceps (A)
Chestnut-eared bunting, Emberiza fucata
Pine bunting, Emberiza leucocephalos (A)
Ortolan bunting, Emberiza hortulana (A)
Slaty bunting, Emberiza siemsseni (A)
Yellow-throated bunting, Emberiza elegans (A)
Ochre-rumped bunting, Emberiza yessoensis (A)
Pallas's bunting, Emberiza pallasi (A)
Reed bunting, Emberiza schoeniclus (A)
Yellow-breasted bunting, Emberiza aureola
Little bunting, Emberiza pusilla
Rustic bunting, Emberiza rustica (A)
Yellow bunting, Emberiza sulphurata
Black-faced bunting, Emberiza spodocephala
Chestnut bunting, Emberiza rutila
Yellow-browed bunting, Emberiza chrysophrys 
Tristram's bunting, Emberiza tristrami

See also

List of birds
Lists of birds by region

References

External links
Hong Kong Wildtracks, a database of birds and frogs found in Hong Kong with survey data, images and soundtracks, co-developed by Hong Kong Baptist University Library and Hong Kong Bird Watching Society

Hong Kong
 
Birds
Hong Kong